is a municipal government agency responsible for public transport in Nagoya, Japan.  The organization operates subways and buses. It was founded in 1922, as an operator of Nagoya City Tram bought from Nagoya Electric Railroad, the current Nagoya Railroad. The bureau sells Manaca, replacing the older Tranpass system.

Transportation
Currently operational
Nagoya Municipal Subway
Nagoya Municipal Bus
Discontinued
Nagoya City Tram
Nagoya Municipal Trolleybus
Higashiyama Park Monorail

External links

Transportation Bureau City of Nagoya, official website

Government of Nagoya
Transport in Nagoya
Nagoya